"Bet" is a song performed by French-British rapper, singer and songwriter Octavian, featuring vocals from English rapper Skepta and Michael Phantom. It was the lead single from Octavian's mixtape Endorphins, released by Black Butter Records on March 1, 2019. The song peaked at number 44 on the UK Singles Chart.

Music video
A music video to accompany the release of "Bet" was first released onto YouTube on 27 February 2019.

Charts

Release history

References

2019 songs
2019 singles
Skepta songs
Songs written by Skepta